France 3 Bretagne is one of France 3's regional services, broadcasting to people in the administrative region of Brittany. It was founded on 2 February 1964 as RTF Télé-Bretagne.

France 3 broadcasts mainly in French and also in Breton. The service is headquartered in Rennes.

Current programs
 JT Local 19/20 Iroise
 L'enquête Ouest
 JT Local 19/20 Maine
 Mouchig-Dall
 'xMidi sports Bali Breizh''

Former programs
 C'est mieux le matin 
 Digor Din 
 Son da zont
 Red An Amzer 
 Te ha Me

Presenters
 Jean-Pierre Lyvinec 
 Sylvie Denis 
 Yves-Herle Gourves 
 Virginie Charbonneau 
 Sébastien Thomas 
 Bernez Quillien 
 and more

References

External links 

  

03 Bretagne
Mass media in Brittany
Breton language
Television channels and stations established in 1964
Mass media in Rennes
Television in minority languages